Hasanabad (also Romanized as Ḩasanābād) is a village in Ahlamerestaq-e Jonubi Rural District, in the Central District of Mahmudabad County, Mazandaran Province, Iran.

It is located on the Caspian Sea.

At the 2006 census, its population was 173, in 43 families.

References 

Populated places in Mahmudabad County
Populated coastal places in Iran
Populated places on the Caspian Sea